Phalguna is a month of the Hindu calendar. In India's national civil calendar, Phalguna is twelfth month of the year, and corresponds with February/March in the Gregorian calendar.

In Luni-Solar calendars, Phalguna may begin on either the new moon or the full moon around the same time of year, and is the twelfth month of the year. However, in Gujarat, Kartika is the first month of the year, and so Phalguna follows as the fifth month for Gujaratis. The holidays of Holi (15 Phalguna in Amanta System/30 Phalguna In Purnimanta System) and Maha Shivaratri (14th Phalguna in Purnimanta System) are observed in this month.

In the Vikram Sambat calendar, Phalguna is the eleventh month of the year.

In solar religious calendars, Phalguna begins with the Sun's entry into Aquarius, and is the twelfth month of the solar year.

In the Vaishnava calendar, Govinda governs this month. Gaura-purnima celebrating the birth of the saint Chaitanya Mahaprabhu (1486–1534) also falls in this month.

Festivals
Most parts of North India see the early celebration of the famous Hindu festival Holi in this month. Holi is celebrated at the end of the winter season on the last full moon day of the lunar month Phalguna (Phalguna Purnima), which usually falls in the later part of February or March.

The Hindu festival of Shigmo is also celebrated in Goa and Konkan in the month of Phalguna. Celebrations can stretch over a month and may last even after the Hindu Luni-Solar New Year begins. Another popular fair is Phalguna Mela in Khatushyamji in Rajasthan.

See also

 Astronomical basis of the Hindu calendar
Hindu units of measurement
 Hindu astronomy
 Jyotish

References

12